Andrei Vyacheslavovich Loktionov (born 30 May 1990) is a Russian professional ice hockey player who is currently playing with HC Spartak Moscow in the Kontinental Hockey League (KHL). He also played in the National Hockey League (NHL) with the Los Angeles Kings, New Jersey Devils, and the Carolina Hurricanes. Loktionov was drafted by the Kings in the fifth round, 128th overall, at the 2008 NHL Entry Draft

Playing career
A product of the HC Khimik hockey school in Voskresensk, Loktionov then skated for Spartak Moscow's system before signing with Lokomotiv Yaroslavl. He is also a longtime member of the 1990-born Team Russia. He was drafted 123rd overall in the 2008 NHL Entry Draft by the Los Angeles Kings.

During the 2010–11 season, Loktionov scored his first career NHL goal on 19 October 2010, against Justin Peters of the Carolina Hurricanes. He was with the Kings during their 2012 Stanley Cup championship season, but did not have his name engraved on the Stanley Cup as he only played 39 regular season games (less than half of the season) with the team.

On 6 February 2013, Loktionov was acquired by the New Jersey Devils in exchange for a fifth-round draft pick in the 2013 NHL Entry Draft. He was then assigned to the Devils' American Hockey League (AHL) affiliate, the Albany Devils.

On 5 March 2014, Loktionov was traded to the Carolina Hurricanes, along with a 2017 conditional third-round draft pick, in exchange for winger Tuomo Ruutu. At the end of the season, the Hurricanes opted not to provide Loktionov with a qualifying offer and as a result, he became an unrestricted free agent on 1 July 2014.

Without a club midway into the 2014–15 season, Loktionov signed for the remainder of the season to return to Lokomotiv Yaroslavl in the KHL on 28 November 2014.

After three seasons in the KHL with Lokomotiv, Loktionov as a free agent following the 2016–17 season, opted for another attempt at the NHL in accepting a professional try-out to attend his original draft club, the Los Angeles Kings training camp on 14 July 2017. He was released by the Kings on 27 September 2017. Loktionov returned to Russia and continued his tenure with Lokomotiv.

After five seasons with Lokomotiv Yaroslavl, Loktionov left as a free agent following the 2018–19 season. He signed a one-year contract to continue in the KHL with Metallurg Magnitogorsk on 1 May 2019. In the 2019–20 season, Loktionov played in a bottom six role registering just 3 goals and 13 points in 60 regular season games. He made 5 post-season appearances, collecting 2 assists.

Loktionov opted for free agency for the second straight season, agreeing to an optional two-year contract with contending club, CSKA Moscow on 1 May 2020.

Following his first season with CSKA, Loktionov's rights were traded to Amur Khabarovsk on 28 May 2021. With Loktionov, unwilling to sign with Amur, he was later traded to Spartak Moscow in exchange for Kirill Slepets and monetary compensation on 25 August 2021. He was signed to a two-year contract extension with Spartak on 28 August.

Career statistics

Regular season and playoffs

International

Awards
 Won gold with Team Russia in the 2007 IIHF World U18 Championships
 Won silver with Team Russia in the 2008 IIHF World U18 Championships
 Won the Memorial Cup with the Windsor Spitfires in 2009
 Won the Stanley Cup with the Los Angeles Kings in 2012
 Won gold with Team Russia in the 2014 IIHF World Championship

References

External links
 

1990 births
Living people
Albany Devils players
Carolina Hurricanes players
HC CSKA Moscow players
Lokomotiv Yaroslavl players
Los Angeles Kings draft picks
Los Angeles Kings players
Manchester Monarchs (AHL) players
Metallurg Magnitogorsk players
New Jersey Devils players
People from Voskresensk
Russian ice hockey centres
HC Spartak Moscow players
Stanley Cup champions
Windsor Spitfires players
Sportspeople from Moscow Oblast